This table displays the top-rated primetime television series of the 2006–07 season as measured by Nielsen Media Research.

References

2006 in American television
2007 in American television
2006-related lists
2007-related lists
Lists of American television series